Notable Slovak football transfers in the summer transfer window 2017 by club. Only transfers of the Fortuna Liga and DOXXbet liga are included.

Fortuna Liga

MŠK Žilina

In:

Out:

ŠK Slovan Bratislava

In:

 

Out:

MFK Ružomberok

In:

Out:

FK AS Trenčín

In:

 
 

 

Out:

FK Železiarne Podbrezová

In:

Out:

FC Spartak Trnava

In:

 

Out:

FC DAC 1904 Dunajská Streda

In:

Out:

MFK Zemplín Michalovce

In:

Out:

FK Senica

In:

 

Out:

FC ViOn Zlaté Moravce

In:

 
 

Out:

1. FC Tatran Prešov

In:

Out:

FC Nitra

In:

Out:

2. liga

FC VSS Košice

In:

Out:

MFK Skalica

In:

Out:

FC ŠTK 1914 Šamorín

In:

Out:

Partizán Bardejov

In:

Out:

FC Lokomotíva Košice

In:

Out:

FK Poprad

In:

Out:

FK Inter Bratislava

In:

Out:

KFC Komárno

In:

Out:

ŠKF Sereď

In:

Out:

FK Spišská Nová Ves
 

In:

Out:

References

Transfers
Slovakia
2017